The Brucknerhaus is a festival and congress centre in Linz, Austria named after the Austrian composer Anton Bruckner. The building was designed by Finnish architects Heikki and Kaija Siren. Its construction took place from 1969 to 1973. It opened on 23 March 1974.

It holds about 200 performances per year, with about 180,000 of total audience. It is home to the International Brucknerfest Linz and the Linzer Klangwolke, two annual musical events.

Brucknerhaus has three main halls:
 Large or Brucknersaal (named after Anton Bruckner): 1,420 seats, standing room for 150
 Middle or Stiftersaal (named after Adalbert Stifter): 352 seats, standing room for 40
 Small or Keplersaal (named after Johannes Kepler): 100–150 seats

References

External links 

Concert halls in Austria
Anton Bruckner
Music venues completed in 1974
Buildings and structures in Linz
Tourist attractions in Linz
Heikki and Kaija Siren buildings